Hangács is a village in Borsod-Abaúj-Zemplén County in northeastern Hungary.  it had a population of 645. In 2015 it had a population of 581. It is around 25km North of Edelény. For a long time it was hard to access the village, only being accessible from a side road from the 2617 road. Following Hungary's admittance to the European Union, a road to the village was built.

References

Populated places in Borsod-Abaúj-Zemplén County